Ed Larvadain III is an American attorney and politician serving as a member of the Louisiana House of Representatives from the 26th district. He assumed office in 2019.

Education 
Larvadain's father, Ed Larvadain Jr., was a prominent civil rights attorney in Alexandria, Louisiana. Larvadain earned a Bachelor of Arts degree in political science from Southern University and a Juris Doctor from the Southern University Law Center.

Career 
Since graduating from law school in 1992, Larvadain has worked as an attorney. Larvadain was elected to the Louisiana House of Representatives in 2018 and assumed office in 2019. He is a member of the Civil Law and Procedure Committee.

References

External links

Living people
People from Alexandria, Louisiana
Southern University alumni
Southern University Law Center alumni
Louisiana lawyers
Democratic Party members of the Louisiana House of Representatives
African-American state legislators in Louisiana
21st-century American politicians
Year of birth missing (living people)
21st-century African-American politicians